TS Galaxy F.C. is a South African football club based in Kameelrivier (Nkangala District Municipality) near Siyabuswa (Mpumalanga) that plays in the PSL.

The club is named after its owner, Tim Sukazi, who purchased the NFD league license from Cape Town All Stars in May 2018.

Prior to purchasing the second-tier status, the club had been playing in the ABC Motsepe League, the third tier.

On Saturday 18 May 2019, TS Galaxy won their first inaugural trophy, the Nedbank Cup, after beating Kaizer Chiefs 1-0 through a Zakhele Lepasa penalty scored in the second minute of second-half injury time. They became the first team from the lower division to win the Nedbank Cup.

In September 2020, the club purchased the PSL status of Highlands Park, and appeared in the 2020–21 South African Premier Division season, finishing ninth.

History
TS Galaxy FC is a South African football club based in Sandton in Johannesburg but playing their Premier Soccer League (PSL) matches at the Mbombela Stadium in Mpumalanga. 
The Rockets, as TS Galaxy are known, were formed in 2015 .The club campaigned in the SAFA Second Division for three seasons before purchasing the National First Division status of Cape Town All Stars in 2018. The Rockets made history in their maiden season in the National First Division when they lifted the Nedbank Cup, getting the better of Kaizer Chiefs in the 2018–19 Nedbank Cupfinal. By doing so, they became the first team in South African football to win the Nedbank Cup while campaigning in National First Division in 2019. In 2020 the club purchased the Premier division status of Highlands Park F.C. After winning the Nedbank Cup, TS Galaxy FC competed in the CAF Confederation Cup.

Club officials/Technical team
BOARD OF DIRECTORS
President:Tim Sukazi
Compliance Officer: Thabang Khoza
MANAGEMENT TEAM AND STAFF
Football Manager:Ziphozonke Hlubi
Team Manager:Njabulo Sukazi
Marketing Director:Dudu Sukazi
Marketing Manager:Yenziwe Sokhela
Media and Communications Manager:Minenhle Mkhize
TECHNICAL TEAM
Coach:Sead Ramovovic
Assistant coach:Mensur Dogan
Assistant coach: Esau Mtsweni
Goalkeeper coach: Sinky Shongwe

African competition
TS Galaxy played in the 2019–20 CAF Confederation Cup after winning the Nedbank Cup the previous season.

They defeated Saint Louis Suns United and CNaPS Sport before being defeated by Nigeria's Enyimba in the play-off round.

Honours

 Nedbank Cup Winner: 2019

Current squad

Out on loan 
The following players have previously made a league or cup appearance for TS Galaxy and are currently on loan at other teams:

References 

Association football clubs established in 2015
National First Division clubs
Soccer clubs in Mpumalanga
Nkangala District Municipality
TS Galaxy F.C.